Leucovibrissea is a genus of fungi in the family Vibrisseaceae. The genus is monotypic, containing the single species Leucovibrissea obconica, found in the USA.

References

Helotiales
Monotypic Ascomycota genera
Taxa described in 1936
Fungi of North America